In academia, a visiting scholar, visiting scientist, visiting researcher, visiting fellow, visiting lecturer, or visiting professor is a scholar from an institution who visits a host university to teach, lecture, or perform research on a topic for which the visitor is valued.  In many cases the position is not salaried because visitor is salaried by their home institution (or partially salaried, as in some cases of sabbatical leave from US universities).  Some visiting positions are salaried. 

Typically, a visiting scholar may stay for a couple of months or even a year, though the stay can be extended.  Typically, a visiting scholar is invited by the host institution, and it is not unusual for them to provide accommodation.  Such an invitation is often regarded as recognizing the scholar's prominence in the field.  Attracting prominent visiting scholars often allows the permanent faculty and graduate students to cooperate with prominent academics from other institutions, especially foreign ones.

In the UK, a visiting scholar or visiting academic usually has to pay a so-called bench fee to the university, which will give access to shared office space and other university facilities and resources (such as the library).  Bench fees vary across UK universities.

The purpose of a visiting scholars programs is generally to bring to the university or educational institution in question an exceptional senior scholar who can contribute to the community's intellectual and research endeavors and international projection.  Hence, in addition to conducting their own research, visitors are often expected to participate in productive institutional activities, such as:

 Deliver a formal lecture to the hosting institution
 Engage in formal or informal discussions with graduate or postgraduate research students 
 Undertake collaborative research with faculty or staff 
 Present guest lectures or faculty seminars
 Present a paper as part of the university's seminar program

See also
 Distinguished visiting professor
 Professor, for a visiting professor, more specifically also visiting professor in the U.S.
 Research fellow, for a visiting researcher

References

Academic administration
Higher education
Academic ranks